In mathematics, the exponential function can be characterized in many ways. The following characterizations (definitions) are most common. This article discusses why each characterization makes sense, and why the characterizations are independent of and equivalent to each other. As a special case of these considerations, it will be demonstrated that the three most common definitions given for the mathematical constant e are equivalent to each other.

Characterizations 

The six most common definitions of the exponential function  for real  are:
 Define  by the limit 
One proof that  is irrational uses a special case of this formula.)
 Define  to be the unique number  such that  This is as the inverse of the natural logarithm function, which is defined by this integral.
One could also replace  and the "additional condition" with the single condition . 
 Let  be the unique positive real number satisfying  This limit can be shown to exist. Then define  to be the exponential function with this base.  This definition is particularly suited to computing the derivative of the exponential function.

Larger domains 
One way of defining the exponential function for domains larger than the domain of real numbers is to first define it for the domain of real numbers using one of the above characterizations and then extend it to larger domains in a way which would work for any analytic function.

It is also possible to use the characterisations directly for the larger domain, though some problems may arise. (1), (2), and (4) all make sense for arbitrary Banach algebras. (3) presents a problem for complex numbers, because there are non-equivalent paths along which one could integrate, and (5) is not sufficient. For example, the function f defined (for x and y real) as

satisfies the conditions in (5) without being the exponential function of .  To make (5) sufficient for the domain of complex numbers, one may either stipulate that there exists a point at which f is a conformal map or else stipulate that

In particular, the alternate condition in (5) that  is sufficient since it implicitly stipulates that  be conformal.

Proof that each characterization makes sense 

Some of these definitions require justification to demonstrate that they are well-defined. For example, when the value of the function is defined as the result of a limiting process (i.e. an infinite sequence or series), it must be demonstrated that such a limit always exists.

Characterization 2 
Since

it follows from the ratio test that  converges for all x.

Characterization 3 

is a bijection.  Since  is positive for positive , this function is strictly increasing, hence injective.  If the two integrals

hold, then it is surjective as well.  Indeed, these integrals do hold; they follow from the integral test and the divergence of the harmonic series.

Equivalence of the characterizations 

The following proof demonstrates the equivalence of the first three characterizations given for e above. The proof consists of two parts. First, the equivalence of characterizations 1 and 2 is established, and then the equivalence of characterizations 1 and 3 is established. Arguments linking the other characterizations are also given.

Characterization 1 ⇔ characterization 2 

The following argument is adapted from a proof in Rudin, theorem 3.31, p. 63–65.

Let  be a fixed non-negative real number. Define

By the binomial theorem,

(using x ≥ 0 to obtain the final inequality) so that

where ex is in the sense of definition 2. Here, limsups must be used, because it is not known if tn converges. For the other direction, by the above expression of tn, if 2 ≤ m ≤ n, 

Fix m, and let n approach infinity. Then

(again, liminf's must be used because it is not known if tn converges). Now, taking the above inequality, letting m approach infinity, and putting it together with the other inequality, this becomes

so that

This equivalence can be extended to the negative real numbers by noting  and taking the limit as n goes to infinity.

The error term of this limit-expression is described by

where the polynomial's degree (in x) in the term with denominator nk is 2k.

Characterization 1 ⇔ characterization 3 

Here, the natural logarithm function is defined in terms of a definite integral as above. By the first part of fundamental theorem of calculus,

Besides, 

Now, let x be any fixed real number, and let

, which implies that , where  is in the sense of definition 3. We have

Here, the continuity of ln(y) is used, which follows from the continuity of 1/t:

Here, the result lnan = nlna has been used.  This result can be established for n a natural number by induction, or using integration by substitution.  (The extension to real powers must wait until ln and exp have been established as inverses of each other, so that ab can be defined for real b as eb lna.)

Characterization 1 ⇔ characterization 5 

The following proof is a simplified version of the one in Hewitt and Stromberg, exercise 18.46.  First, one proves that measurability (or here, Lebesgue-integrability) implies continuity for a non-zero function  satisfying , and then one proves that continuity implies  for some k, and finally  implies .

First, a few elementary properties from  satisfying  are proven, and the assumption that  is not identically zero:
 If  is nonzero anywhere (say at x=y), then it is non-zero everywhere.  Proof:  implies .
 .
 . Proof: .
 If  is continuous anywhere (say at x = y), then it is continuous everywhere.

The second and third properties mean that it is sufficient to prove  for positive x.

If  is a Lebesgue-integrable function, then

It then follows that

Therefore:

It follows that  is continuous.

Now,  can be proven, for some k, for all positive rational numbers q.  Let q=n/m for positive integers n and m.  Then

by elementary induction on n.  Therefore,  and thus

If restricted to real-valued , then  is everywhere positive and so k is real.

Finally, by continuity, since  for all rational x, it must be true for all real x since the closure of the rationals is the reals (that is, any real x can be written as the limit of a sequence of rationals).  If  then k = 1.  This is equivalent to characterization 1 (or 2, or 3), depending on which equivalent definition of e one uses.

Characterization 2 ⇔ characterization 4 
Let n be a non-negative integer. In the sense of definition 4 and by induction, .

Therefore 

Using Taylor series,
 This shows that definition 4 implies definition 2.

In the sense of definition 2,

Besides,  This shows that definition 2 implies definition 4.

Characterization 2 ⇒ characterization 6 

In the sense of definition 2,

Characterization 3 ⇔ characterization 4 
Characterisation 3 involves defining the natural logarithm before the exponential function is defined. First,

If , then this area is taken to be negative.

by the definition of an inverse function. Finally,  is defined as the number  such that . It can then be shown that :

We are now in a position to prove that , satisfying the first part of the initial value problem given in characterisation 4:

Then, we merely have to note that , and we are done. Of course, it is much easier to show that characterisation 4 implies characterisation 3. The derivative of  can be found in the following way:

Therefore,

Characterization 5 ⇒ characterization 4 
The conditions {{math|1=f'''(0) = 1}} and  imply both conditions in characterization 4. Indeed, one gets the initial condition  by dividing both sides of the equation

 Characterization 6 ⇒ characterization 4 

In the sense of definition 6, 
By the way , therefore definition 6 implies definition 4.

 References 

 Walter Rudin, Principles of Mathematical Analysis, 3rd edition (McGraw–Hill, 1976), chapter 8.
 Edwin Hewitt and Karl Stromberg, Real and Abstract Analysis'' (Springer, 1965).

Mathematical analysis
Exponentials
Exponential function
Articles containing proofs